Lüderitz Airport  is an airport serving Lüderitz, a town in the ǁKaras Region of Namibia.

Airlines and destinations

See also
List of airports in Namibia
Transport in Namibia

References

External links
 
OurAirports - Luderitz
OpenStreetMap - Luderitz

Airports in Namibia
Buildings and structures in ǁKaras Region
Lüderitz